The Paston Way is a footpath. It is entirely within the English county of Norfolk in the United Kingdom. The footpath is twenty miles in length, the portals to the path are Cromer at its northwestern end and North Walsham at it southeastern end.

The Designation
The Paston way takes its name from the Paston Family who during the Medieval and Tudor periods were the dominant and wealthy landowners in which much of the trail passes. The Paston Family in turn had taken their name after the north eastern coastal village of Paston. Their origins were from Wulston, one of William the Conqueror’s men who  arrived with him in 1066.

Description of the Route

Section 1

Starting at the southeastern end, the path begins at the Parish Church of St Nicholas in the town of North Walsham. This is also the path's conjunction with the Weavers Way. Leaving the church the route heads northwards along the old Mundesley road out of the town. On the outskirts of the town the path follows the track bed of the disused Norfolk and Suffolk Joint Railway Company which linked North Walsham to Cromer. The path crosses the North Walsham & Dilham Canal at Swafield. Knapton Cutting, as this part of the trail is known, is also a nature and Butterfly reserve. This section is an area of wild flowers, brambles, scrub and undisturbed grassy banks, which make it an ideal habitat for butterflies. Nineteen different species have been recorded. Another couple of miles through quiet lanes brings the path to Knapton. Knapton Parish church is called St Peters and Paul's and marks the end of the first section of the route.

Section 2
It is worth a visit to see the roof inside Knapton Church with its ornate Double hammer beam roof.

From Knapton the path heads south east across several open fields towards the village of Edingthorpe. The approach to the village is up a gently sloping farm track towards Edingthorpe Parish church which is called All Saints.

Section 3
The 'way' continues on from All Saints northwest towards the coast and the village of Bacton. A little way along this section a detour can be made at church farm. Take the path north to Paston. Visit the parish church of St Margaret's. inside can be seen the impressive Paston Monuments to the family that gave the trail its name. Retrace your footsteps to church farm and then continue on down the winding lane to Bacton Church.

Section 4

Bacton church is called St Andrews which is approached via an attractive avenue of trees which is in sharp contrast to the Bacton Gas Interconnector Terminal that dominates the horizon behind.
The ‘Way’ passes through the church yard and out across open farm land towards the North Sea coast at the western end of the village. The next three miles take a route along the beach passing by the Gas terminal. At Mundesley the rout follows the main coast road to the northern tip of the village and to All Saints Church.

Section 5

The route now heads back inland towards the next village of Gimingham this part of the trail passes through the valley of the River Mun. The countryside along this section is pleasant and very peaceful. One usual sight to the north of the ‘Trail’ is the giant white sphere which can be glimpsed occasionally. This is the Trimingham Early warning station which is in fact part of RAF Neatishead. The path enters the village of Gimingham past the rebuilt old corn watermill and the preserved steam engine. Like Mundesley, Gimingham parish church is called All Saints. It is south down the main street from the engine. From this point there is an optional tour which takes in the villages of Trunch, Swafield, Bradfield and then back on itself to Trimingham and its unusually named church St John the Baptist's Head.

Section 6
From Gimingham the path heads towards Southrepps via a lane known as Jack o' Lantern's Lane. The lane is reputed to be the territory of the Lantern man who lures all travellers to their doom. The parish church of Southrepps is called St James. Note the corbels and gargoyles high up on this church. At this point if you wish to visit the church and village, you must walk south into the village and then retrace your footsteps back to rejoin the Paston Way.

Section 7
From Southrepps the path takes a route to the south of Frogshall Hamlet along the ancient farm lanes towards the coastal village of Overstrand. There are two detour made on this section the first is to the village of Northrepps.

Detour A
Northrepps parish church is called St Mary the Virgin, retrace your footstep back to Paston Way or pass through the village turning east over Hungry Hill and take the second detour.

Detour B
Sidestrand has been forever personified as "Poppyland"   having been described as such by Clement Scott In 1883. The Daily Telegraph printed an article which Scott had written about a visit to the north Norfolk coast. He became enamored of the district and gave it the name Poppyland. His writing was responsible for members of the London theatre set visiting and investing in homes in the area. It is in this part of the world that he is perhaps best remembered, but ironically, he was unhappy at the result of his popularization of the area. Sidestrand small parish church is called St Michael and All Angels. This church was moved stone by stone 1880 a third of a mile inland to prevent it from falling into the sea due to coastal erosion. Previous to this date the church had already suffered the loss of its tower in 1841 when it was washed down the cliff after a heavy storm.

Section 8

Return to Hungry Hill via Sandy lane and the Shrieking pit which legend has it was the scene of the demise of a young maiden lured to her death by evil spirits. Then the path moves on to Northrepps and then turn north towards Overstrand down Toll's Hill, once the site of a warning beacon during the time of the Napoleonic wars. The route now enters the village and back to the shoreline there. Overstrand Parish church is called St Martin's and Priscilla Buxton is buried there.

Section 9
The last section of Paston way is between Overstrand and Cromer. The route follows the coastline here although an alternative is to follow the coast road. This part of the coastline is reputed to be the stalking ground of Legendary hellhound Black Shuck. And so on to Cromer and the Parish Church of St Peter and Saint Paul. The tower of the church is 160 ft high and is well worth a visit and also marks the end of Paston Way. The path links with the North Norfolk Coastal Path/Peddars Way and the UK National Trails Network.

Gallery of Churches

Gallery of Route

External links 
The Paston Way

References

Footpaths in Norfolk
Long-distance footpaths in England